Northeastern Province or Northeast Province may refer to:

North Eastern Province, Kenya
North Eastern Province, Sri Lanka
Northeast Province (IMCRA region), an Australian marine biogeographic province
North-East Province (Western Australia), a former electoral province of Western Australia
Northeastern provinces, an informal grouping of three Chinese provinces
North-East Frontier, province of British India now Assam
North-East Frontier Agency, former political division of India now Arunachal Pradesh

Province name disambiguation pages